The Museum of Spirits is situated on the island of Djurgården in Stockholm, Sweden. The museum was about Sweden's wine and spirit history and the manufacture of alcohol. In the fixed exhibitions, showed older production and bottling equipment for wine and spirits, labels from older wine and spirits in Sweden, an exhibition about Swedish drinking habits and beverage visor, objects from ancient wine history and a complete interior design from a wine trade from the time before Systembolaget monopoly. The museum has permanent and temporary exhibitions related to the drinking culture of Sweden. The museum also functions as an art gallery, as it houses and displays the Absolut Art Collection.

The museum houses three exhibition venues, including the permanent, interactive exhibition Sweden: Spirits of a Nation (Spritlandet Sverige).

History 
The Museum of Spirits was opened as the Wine & Spirit Historical Museum in the Grönstedtska palace, in Vasastaden, Stockholm, in 1967, in conjunction with the 50th anniversary of the founding of the state-owned company AB Vin & Sprit.

In the spirit museum, among other things, it is shown by the state of the Absolut Art Collection, a collection of 850 artwork from 1986 onwards for Absolut Vodka of Andy Warhol and 550 other famous artists. This was excluded from the state's sales of Wine & Sprit AB to Pernod in 2008 after a unanimous parliamentary decision, caused by a motion of Leif Pagrotsky. Selection of the art collection is shown in an annual thematic exhibition that is from spring and over the summer. Every autumn is an Absolut-artist in to make a solar setting. 

In May 2012, the spirits museum moved to 2,000 square meters of large premises in the Galärskjulen at Djurgården in Stockholm. 

In 2014, Petter Nisson, who had previously operated La Gazzetta (described by the New York Times as "one of the most celebrated creative neo-bistros in Paris"), opened a restaurant at the museum.

List of temporary exhibitions

 2017, Rocky at the Museum of Spirits, comic artist Martin Kellerman constructed four spaces representing rooms and places frequently used in his self-biographical comic strip Rocky.
 2017 — 2018, Under the Surface — Bertil Vallien, on the work of innovative glassmaker Bertil Vallien.
 2017 — 2018, Champagne!

Absolut Art Collection
The Absolut Art Collection consists of work created between 1985 and 2004. It contains nearly 900 artworks - paintings, graphic art, photography, furniture, fashion and handicrafts - by 600 artists and designers, all in some way portraying the Absolut Vodka bottle.

The first piece commissioned was Andy Warhol’s Absolut Warhol, in 1986. Other commissions went to, for example, Keith Haring, Kenny Scharf, Steven Salzman, Damien Hirst, Tom Ford, Louise Bourgeois, Ola Billgren, Dan Wolgers and Linn Fernström.

See also

Alcoholic drinks in Sweden
Bratt System
Gothenburg Public House System
Snapsvisa
1922 Swedish prohibition referendum
Systembolaget
Swedish temperance movements
Vodka belt

References

External links

 Official website

Spirits
1967 establishments in Sweden
Museums established in 1967
Alcohol in Sweden
Art museums and galleries in Stockholm
Drinking culture
Spirits
Spirits
Contemporary art galleries in Sweden